The Maltese order of precedence is a conventionally set list. It is only used as a guide for protocol.

Order of precedence as from 2016 
President of Malta (George Vella)
Prime Minister (Robert Abela)
Speaker of the House (Angelo Farrugia)
Metropolitan Archbishop of Malta (Charles J. Scicluna)
Chief Justice (Mark Chetcuti)
Government Ministers
Parliamentary Secretaries
Leader of the Opposition (Bernard Grech)
Former Presidents
Ugo Mifsud Bonnici (4 April 1994 - 4 April 1999)
Eddie Fenech Adami (4 April 2004 - 4 April 2009)
George Abela (4 April 2009 - 4 April 2014)
Marie-Louise Coleiro Preca (4 April 2014 - 4 April 2019)
Former Prime Ministers
Karmenu Mifsud Bonnici (22 December 1984 - 12 May 1987)
Eddie Fenech Adami (12 May 1987 - 28 October 1996) (6 September 1998 - 23 March 2004)
Alfred Sant (28 October 1996 - 6 September 1998)
Lawrence Gonzi (23 March 2004 - 11 March 2013)
Joseph Muscat (11 March 2013 - 12 January 2020)
Diplomatic Corps
Bishop of Gozo (Anton Teuma)
Principal Permanent Secretary
Judges
Attorney General
Deputy Speaker of the House of Representatives
Members of Parliament
Former Metropolitan Archbishops of Malta, Chief Justices and Speakers of the House of Representatives
Magistrates of the Lower Court
Permanent secretaries, Commissioner of the Malta Police Force (Cmsr. Angelo Gafa'), Commander of the Armed Forces of Malta (Brigadier Clinton J. O'Neill)
Auditor General and Ombudsman

Order of precedence to 2019 

President of Malta (George Vella)
Foreign heads of state/Reigning monarchs
Prime Minister (Robert Abela)
Deputy Prime Minister (Chris Fearne)
Chief Justice (Joseph Camilleri)
Speaker of the House (Angelo Farrugia)
Ministers of the Government
Justices of the Superior Court
Parliamentary Secretaries
Members of Parliament
Magistrates of the Lower Court
Attorney General
Commander of the Armed Forces of Malta (Brigadier Mark Xuereb
Mayors, in their jurisdiction
Local Councillors, in their jurisdiction
Ambassadors, in order of establishment of diplomatic relations with their respective countries

Notes 

Order of precedence
Malta